Pallavi Batra is an Indian film, ad-film & theatre actor, TV host and voice-over artist. With a strong theatre background, Pallavi has established herself as a promising Bollywood actress and a fresh, young face for brands.

Film and TV career 
Pallavi has starred in prominent Bollywood films and exciting Web Films with leading production houses and made a mark in the advertising and TV world.

Filmography

Advertisements 
Croma: Pallavi was the face of the Back to School Campaign 2022 playing all through Wimbledon
Dream 11 IPL : Pallavi was the face of the viral ad with Jasprit Bumrah for the 2020 IPL
Flipkart : An inspirational ad for the Flipkart sellers starring Pallavi Batra
Vodafone: Acted in the popular TV commercial for Vodafone as a part of the 'Made for you' series directed by Rajiv Rao
Bisleri: Was the face of the Bisleri 500 launch TVC targeting college students in the commercial directed by Vishwesh Krishnamoorthy
Philips Avent : Pallavi plays a mother in this digital ad with more than 1 million views
Aman ki Asha: Pallavi played the leading role in the commercial promoting Indo-Pak friendship directed by Gajraj Rao
Big Bazaar: Pallavi was a part of their campaign celebrating 10 years in India directed by Bollywood director Rajkumar Gupta
PSA for personal health
SBI Home Loans
SRS Grocery Bazaar
PSA for Pradhan Mantri Surakshit Matritva Abhiyan

TV and online anchoring 
 Lead anchor for "Rasoi Project" on EatTreat's YouTube channel
Lead anchor for entertainment news show "Unscripted" on International News Channel- WION
 Pallavi was the lead anchor for "Unicorn: Chasing the start-up dream" Season 1 on NDTV Prime
She worked as a freelance anchor for NDTV Goodtimes for shows such as:
 Magnetic Mizoram Investors Summit 
 Britannia diabetic food trail 
 Atosa Launch Ahmedabad 
 Swarovski Sparkling Inspirations 
 GeoSpa asiaSpa Awards 
 Jabong Online Fashion Week 
 BMW India Bridal Fashion Week 
 FnP Wedding Fraternity Meet 
 Jaguar Trousseau Week 
 Anchored the launch of the Amazon India Fashion Week in Delhi
 She has hosted Live Hangouts for the Fashion Design Council of India during Wills Lifestyle India Fashion Week AW'14 with leading Indian fashion designers

Early years 
She started her acting career at the age of 13 where she played the role of an aspiring pilot in ‘9/11: The Last Fall’ the directorial debut of Abhishek Sharma (of Tere Bin Laden fame). She was, then, selected for a workshop conducted by the prestigious National School of Drama at the age of 14 where she played the lead role in the finale show.

Theatre experience 
‘Zangoora’ (performed over 500 shows): Pallavi played two main roles for over 3 years in India's first and biggest Bollywood musical being staged at Kingdom of Dreams, Gurgaon. 
She received training from the industry's best during the production. The play was directed by Broadway director David Freeman, along with Mr. Darshan Zariwala, Mr. Dilip Shankar and Vikranth Pawar. She received extensive dance training from Shiamak Davar’s troupe and extensive training in aerial work and harness flying.

She worked alongside Viveik Oberoi, Isha Sharvani, Gauahar Khan, Yuri, and Hussain Kuwajerwala
‘Ten Years with Guru Dutt: Abrar Alvi’s Journey’: Pallavi played a leading role, and the role of Waheeda Rehman in the play staged at NCPA theatre Mumbai (2013)and various theatres in New Delhi
'Myth, Mystery and Magic' : A Tribute to Girish Karnad with Sohaila Kapur
‘Walking the Path’: Pallavi played the female lead in the play directed by Dilip Shankar, and performed at the India Habitat Centre, Delhi on 2 October 2011 (Gandhi Jayanti)
‘Krishna Sudama’: Batra assisted veteran theatre person Sushma Seth in directing a play for rehabilitated children in association with the NGO Arpana
‘Pride and Prejudice in 10 minutes’: Pallavi played the lead role of Elizabeth in the play written by Tim Hehir, as part of the Short & Sweet theatre festival finale in Delhi. (nominated for Best Actress)
‘Infinite Stupidity’: She experimented with clowning in the play directed by LAMDA graduate Ashwath Bhatt
'Strictly Dandia': She acted in the play titled directed by senior theatre director and the Director, Arts at the British Council, India, Vivek Mansukhani. Performed at Taj Palace, Delhi (October 2009)
Trained the children of Lotus Valley International School and put up a play- Sound of Music for their annual day

References

External links

Actresses from New Delhi
Indian film actresses
Indian stage actresses
Indian television actresses
Living people
Indian women television presenters
Indian television presenters
Actresses in Hindi cinema
Year of birth missing (living people)